Sanibel is an island and city in Lee County, Florida, United States. The population was 6,382 at the 2020 census. It is part of the Cape Coral-Fort Myers, Florida Metropolitan Statistical Area. The island, also known as Sanibel Island, constitutes the entire city.  It is a barrier island—a collection of sand on the leeward side of the more solid coral-rock of Pine Island.

Most of the city proper is at the east end of the island. After the Sanibel causeway was built to replace the ferry in May 1963, the city was incorporated in 1974 and the residents asserted control over development by establishing the Sanibel Comprehensive Land Use Plan, helping to maintain a balance between development and preservation of the island's ecology. In September 2022, the causeway was heavily damaged by Hurricane Ian.  

Due to easy causeway access, Sanibel is a popular tourist destination known for its shell beaches and wildlife refuges. More than half of the island is made up of wildlife refuges, the largest being J. N. "Ding" Darling National Wildlife Refuge. The Island hosts the Sanibel Historical Village and a variety of other museums including the Bailey-Matthews National Shell Museum.

History

Sanibel and Captiva formed as one island about 6,000 years ago. The first known humans in the area were the Calusa, who arrived about 2,500 years ago. The Calusa were a powerful []Indian nation who came to dominate most of Southwest Florida through trade via their elaborate system of canals and waterways. Sanibel remained an important Calusa settlement until the collapse of their empire, soon after the arrival of the Europeans.

During the 1700's, Cuban fishermen would seasonally travel from their homes and set up fishing camps along the Gulf Coast, called ranchos, including on Sanibel Island. 

In 1765, the first known appearance of a harbor on Sanibel is shown on a map as Puerto de S. Nibel (the "v" and "b" being interchangeable); thus, the name may have evolved from "San Nibel". Alternatively, the name may derive, as many believe, from "(Santa) Ybel", which survives in the old placename "Point Ybel", where the Sanibel Island Light is located. How it would have gotten this name, however, is a matter of conjecture. One story says it was named by Juan Ponce de León for Queen Isabella I of Castile; the island may indeed be named for this queen or the saint whose name she shares, either by Ponce de León or someone later. Another attributes the name to Roderigo Lopez, the first mate of José Gaspar (Gasparilla), after his beautiful lover Sanibel whom he had left behind in Spain. Like most of the lore surrounding Gasparilla, however, this story is apocryphal, as the above references to recognizable variants of the name predate the buccaneer's supposed reign.

Sanibel is not the only island in the area to figure prominently in the legends of Gaspar; Captiva, Useppa, and Gasparilla are also connected. Sanibel also appears in another tale, this one involving Gaspar's ally-turned-rival Black Caesar, said to have been a former Haitian slave who escaped during the Haitian Revolution to become a pirate. According to folklore, Black Caesar came to the Gulf of Mexico during the War of 1812 to avoid interference from the British. In the Gulf he befriended Gasparilla, who allowed him to establish himself on Sanibel Island. Eventually the old Spaniard discovered Caesar had been stealing from him and chased him off, but not before his loot had been buried.

In 1832 the Florida Peninsular Land Company established a settlement on Sanibel (then spelled "Sanybel"). However, the colony never took off, and was abandoned by 1849. It was this group that initially petitioned for a lighthouse on the island. The island was re-populated after the implementation of the Homestead Act in 1862, and again a lighthouse was petitioned. Construction on the Sanibel Island Lighthouse was completed in 1884, but the community remained small.

In May 1963 a causeway linking Sanibel and Captiva to the mainland was opened, resulting in an explosion of growth. The City of Sanibel passed new restrictions on development after it was incorporated; these were challenged by developers, to no avail. Currently the only buildings on the island taller than two stories date before 1974, and there are no fast food or chain restaurants allowed on the island except a Dairy Queen and a Subway, which were on the island before the laws were enacted. A new causeway was completed in 2007; it replaced the worn out 1963 spans, which were not designed to carry heavy loads or large numbers of vehicles. The new bridge features a "flyover" span tall enough for sailboats to pass under, replacing the old bridge's bascule drawbridge span. The original bridge was demolished and its remains were sunk into the water to create artificial reefs in the Gulf of Mexico.

Development 

The main town is located on the eastern end of the island. The city was formed in 1974, as a direct result of the main causeway being built in 1963 to replace the ferry, and the rampant construction and development that occurred afterward. Developers sued over the new restrictions, but the city and citizens prevailed in their quest to protect the island. The only buildings above two to three stories now on the barrier island were built during that period.

A short bridge over Blind Pass links Sanibel to Captiva Island. More than half of the two islands are preserved in its natural state as wildlife refuges. Visitors can drive, walk, bike, or kayak through the J. N. "Ding" Darling National Wildlife Refuge  The island's most famous landmark, the Sanibel Lighthouse, is located at the eastern end of the island, adjacent to the fishing pier. The main thoroughfare, Periwinkle Way, is where the majority of stores and restaurants are located, while the Gulf Drives (East, Middle and West) play host to most of the accommodations.

The Sanibel-Captiva Conservation Foundation, a not-for-profit organization, has also been a key player in helping to curb uncontrolled commercial growth and development on the island. Since 1967, SCCF has been dedicated to the preservation of natural resources on and around Sanibel and Captiva and has led efforts to acquire and preserve environmentally sensitive land on the islands including critical wildlife habitats, rare and unique subtropical plant communities, tidal wetlands, and freshwater wetlands along the Sanibel River.

The Wall Street Journal selected Sanibel and Captiva Islands as one of the 10 Best Places for Second Homes in 2010.

Geography

Sanibel is located at  (26.439608, –82.080456).

Demographics

As of the census of 2020, there were 6,828 people, 3,359 households, and 2,273 families residing in the city. There were 7,821 dwelling units at an average density of .The racial makeup of the city was 98.0% White, 0.6% African American, 0.1% Native American, 0.4% Asian, 0.00%(1) Pacific Islander, 0.3% from other races, and 0.6% from two or more races. Hispanic or Latino of any race were 2.3% of the population.

There were 3,359 households, out of which 8.5% had children under the age of 18 living with them, 63.8% were married couples living together, 2.7% had a female householder with no husband present, and 32.3% were non-families. 27.9% of all households were made up of individuals, and 16.7% had someone living alone who was 65 years of age or older. The average household size was 1.92 and the average family size was 2.28.

Among the population; 8.5% under the age of 19, 1.1% from 20 to 24, 7.5% from 25 to 44, 32.7% from 45 to 64, and those aged 65 or older represented 50.1%. The median age was 65 years. For every 100 females, there were 89.8 males. For every 100 females age 18 and over, there were 89.5 males age 18 and over.

The median income for a household in the city was $97,788, and the median income for a family was $138,194. Males had a median income of $80,152 versus $45,458 for females. The per capita income for the city was $79,742. About 3.6% of families and 7.0% of the population were below the poverty line, with 21.3% of those under age 18 and 3.4% of those age 65 or over.

Ecology

The island's curved shrimp-like shape forms Tarpon Bay on the north side of the island. It is linked to the mainland by the Sanibel Causeway, which runs across two small manmade islets and the Intracoastal Waterway. A short bridge links Sanibel Island to Captiva Island over Blind Pass. 
The Bailey-Matthews Shell Museum on Sanibel is the only museum in the world dedicated entirely to the study of shells. The Gulf-side beaches are excellent on both Sanibel and Captiva, and are world-renowned for their variety of seashells, which include coquinas, scallops, whelks, sand dollars, and many other species of both shallow-water and deeper-water mollusks, primarily bivalves and gastropods.
Sanibel Island is home to a significant variety of birds, including the roseate spoonbill and several nesting pairs of bald eagles. Birds can be seen on the beaches, the causeway islands, and the reserves, including J. N. "Ding" Darling National Wildlife Refuge. Common sights include pelicans, herons, egrets, and anhingas, as well as the more common birds like terns, sandpipers, and seagulls.

There is a population of American alligators on Sanibel Island. A lone rare American crocodile had been seen at the Wildlife Refuge for over 30 years, but she died in 2010 of unseasonably cold winters or old age.  A memorial was set up at J.N. "Ding" Darling National Wildlife Refuge honoring "Wilma", as she was known by the residents.  A new crocodile was introduced in May 2010 when she was found on a private property and relocated to J.N. "Ding" Darling National Wildlife Refuge.  Plants on the island include the native sea grape, sea oats, mangroves, and several types of palm trees. The Australian pine is an introduced species that has spread throughout the island, to some extent overpowering native vegetation and trees. Once mature, the pine blocks sunlight and drops a thick bed of pine needles that affect the soil's pH and prevents new native growth. The ground is very soft under these pines.

The local form of the marsh rice rat has been recognized in some classifications as a separate subspecies, Oryzomys palustris sanibeli.

Wildlife refuges

Preserving the island's natural ecology has always been important to its citizens and visitors alike. A driving force in the preservation of the island is the Sanibel-Captiva Conservation Foundation which was founded in 1967 with a mission to "preserve natural resources and wildlife habitat on and around the islands of Sanibel and Captiva."  of land on Sanibel are under the supervision of the Foundation; included in this land there is a "Marine Laboratory which actively conducts research in areas including seagrasses, mangroves, harmful algal blooms, fish populations and shellfish restoration." Sanibel Captiva Conservation Foundation also has a project called RECON (River, Estuary and Coastal Observing Network) which includes a "network of eight in-water sensors that provide real-time, hourly readings of key water quality parameters."  The foundation also serves to protect the wildlife on the island and has a variety of education programs designed to instruct people about the island's unique ecology.

Currently the refuge provides a home for over 220 species of birds native to the island. Visitors to the refuge can walk, bike, drive, or kayak though the wildlife drive which takes you through  of mangrove tree forests and tidal flats, this drive is perfect for watching the island's wildlife and looking at the island's native vegetation. To show that preserving the wildlife really is important, the drive is closed one day every week, Friday, so that the wildlife can have a day to themselves where they can scavenge for food closer to the drive and not have to be bothered by or fearful of humans. There is also an education center which features "interactive exhibits on refuge ecosystems, the life and work of "Ding" Darling, migratory flyways, and the National Wildlife Refuge System."

Beaches and seashells

Sanibel beaches attract visitors from all around the world, partly because of the large quantities of seashells that frequently wash up there. Many sand dollars can be found as well. One of the reasons for these large accumulations of shells is the fact that Sanibel is a barrier island which is "part of a large plateau that extends out into the Gulf of Mexico for miles. It is this plateau that acts like a shelf for seashells to gather." Sanibel also has an "east-west orientation when most islands are north-south. Hence, the island is gifted with great sandy beaches and an abundance of shells."

People who are lucky enough to find the elegant brown-spotted shell of a Junonia on a Sanibel beach often get their picture in the local newspapers. Junonia volutes are reasonably common living in deep water, but they only rarely wash up; a beach find of a whole shell is greatly prized. Junonia shells can be purchased at local shell shops, or can be seen on display in the Bailey-Matthews National Shell Museum, in some of the glass display tables at the Sanibel Cafe, or at the Sanibel Shell Fair in early March.

Throughout the year, many people come to the beaches of Sanibel to gather shells. People are often seen bending down as they look for seashells, and this posture is known as the "Sanibel Stoop." There are beaches almost all around the island. There are even beaches along the Sanibel causeway, and these are great for fishing and windsurfing. However, beach parking on Sanibel itself is very limited, and in high season finding a convenient parking space can be a challenge.

Lighthouse Beach is named after the famous Sanibel Lighthouse, which includes a popular fishing pier and nature trails. The most secluded beach on the island is Bowman's Beach; there are no hotels in sight and the beach has a "pristine and quiet" atmosphere.

Barron's selected Sanibel and Captiva Islands as one of the 10 Best Places for Second Homes in 2010.

Climate

The months of January through April (peak tourist season on the island) have the coolest temperatures, ranging from  during the day to a cool  at night, and there is very little rainfall on the island during those months. June is when the Island gets most of its rain. The area is prone to being hit by tropical cyclones and hurricanes; the hurricane season starts in June, but most of the activity occurs in September and October. However, local communities have "adapted to cope with these occasional storm threats."

Hurricanes

Southwest Florida rarely suffers direct strikes by hurricanes, but every 20 or so years it takes a significant hit, and about every 40 years a major one. Most of these have affected Sanibel. On August 13, 2004, Sanibel Island was hit hard by Hurricane Charley, a category four hurricane with  winds. It was the strongest to hit Southwest Florida since Hurricane Donna in September 1960. While much of the native vegetation survived, the non-indigenous Australian Pines suffered serious damage, blocking nearly every road. Wildlife officials  also reported that the nests of birds and sea turtles were destroyed. The Sanibel Lighthouse survived with little damage, the Sanibel Causeway suffered relatively minor damage except for a toll booth being tilted partly over, and a small seawall was eroded. Blind Pass was again cut through, but refilled less than one month later. Residents who left before the August 13 storm were not allowed back by the city government until August 18, due to hundreds of downed trees and electric power lines, and the lack of potable water and sanitary sewerage. A temporary city hall for Sanibel was set up on the mainland in a Fort Myers hotel, until utilities and transport could be restored to the island. 

On September 28, 2022, the island suffered extensive damage from Hurricane Ian, which made landfall just to the north of the island as a strong category 4 storm. The Sanibel Causeway partially collapsed during the storm, leaving no road access to the island or nearby Captiva, Florida.

Infrastructure

Transportation

A new three-section causeway bridge to Sanibel was completed during the summer of 2007, with a high-span section replacing the original drawbridge. Multiple sections of the causeway were destroyed in September 2022 by Hurricane Ian, rendering it unusable.

Library

Sanibel Public Library was built in 1994, and was expanded in 2004.  The library houses more than 60,000 titles.

Notable people

The city's best-known resident is former CIA Director Porter Goss, who spearheaded the island's incorporation, became its first mayor, and represented the area in Congress from 1989 until his appointment as CIA Director in 2004.

Other notable people who reside or used to reside on Sanibel include:
R. Tucker Abbott, leading 20th century malacologist/conchologist
Horace William Baden Donegan, Bishop of New York, Episcopal Church in the United States of America 
Clifton Fadiman, author and radio/TV personality
Helaine Fendelman, appraiser
Jean Shepherd, author, screenwriter and radio raconteur
Willard Scott, TV personality
Randy Wayne White, writer of crime fiction and non-fiction adventure tales

In literature

Sanibel Island is the main setting for crime novels written by local author Randy Wayne White. Popular locales are referenced throughout his novels. White's main fictional character is named Doc Ford and due to his popularity, White opened a restaurant in his character's name, Doc Ford's Sanibel Rum Bar & Grill. Sanibel Island is the setting in the prolong of the book People We Meet on Vacation.

In film

Parts of George A. Romero's Day of the Dead were shot on Sanibel Island. Romero had a second home on Sanibel, from which he rewrote Day of the Dead in 1984.

Night Moves was filmed on the Island in 1975, directed by Arthur Penn. It stars Gene Hackman, Jennifer Warren, Susan Clark and features early career appearances by James Woods and Melanie Griffith.

References

External links

Sanibel-Captiva Chamber of Commerce Official website for businesses on Sanibel Island and Captiva Island
City of Sanibel Florida Website Portal style website, Government, Business, Library, Recreation and more
Lee County Visitor & Convention Bureau Information regarding travel and tourism to and around Sanibel Island

 
Seaside resorts in Florida
Populated coastal places in Florida on the Gulf of Mexico
Cities in Florida
Islands of Lee County, Florida
Gulf Coast barrier islands of Florida